Kudrynki Lock - the fourteenth lock on the Augustów Canal (from the Biebrza). Built between 1828 - 1829 by Edward Tadeusz Bieliński and Michał Horain. Closed since the end of World War II until the last overhaul was carried out in 2005-2008.

 Location: 77.4 km channel
 Level difference: 2.27 m
 Length: 43.4 m
 Width: 5.94 m
 Gates: Wooden
 Year built: 1828 - 1829
 Construction Managers: Edward Tadeusz Bieliński and Michał Horain

References

 
 
 

19th-century establishments in Poland
Kudrynki